Waleed Hizam Al-Enezi (born 19 December 1994) is a Saudi Arabian professional footballer who plays as a midfielder for Saudi Pro League side Damac.

Club career
Al-Enezi began his career at hometown club Al-Tadamon. On 17 July 2016, Al-Enezi joined Batin on loan until the end of the 2016–17 season. On 20 January 2018, Al-Enezi once again joined Al-Batin on loan until the end of the 2017–18 season. On 5 February 2021, Al-Enezi was released from his contract by Al-Shabab. On 7 February 2021, Al-Enezi joined Damac. On 16 December 2021, Al-Enezi renewed his contract with Damac for two years.

Career statistics

Club

References

External links
 
 

1994 births
Living people
People from Northern Borders Province
Association football midfielders
Saudi Arabian footballers
Saudi Arabia youth international footballers
Saudi Professional League players
Al-Tadamon SC (Saudi Arabia) players
Al-Shabab FC (Riyadh) players
Al Batin FC players
Damac FC players